Lincolnton Commercial Historic District is a national historic district located at Lincolnton, Lincoln County, North Carolina. It encompasses 62 contributing buildings and 2 contributing objects in the central business district of Lincolnton.  It includes a variety of commercial, institutional, and industrial buildings dating between about 1900 and 1955.  Located in the district are the separately listed Classical Revival style Lincoln County Courthouse and First United Methodist Church.  Other notable buildings include the Frank Beal House (c. 1910), Karl L. Lawing House (c. 1905), Reinhardt Building, Carolina First National Bank, Central Candy and Cigar Company, Jonas Building (c. 1950), Wampum Department Stores (c. 1905), Rhodes and Corriher Company building, and Coca-Cola Bottling Company building.

It was listed on the National Register of Historic Places in 2005.

References

Historic districts on the National Register of Historic Places in North Carolina
Neoclassical architecture in North Carolina
Buildings and structures in Lincoln County, North Carolina
National Register of Historic Places in Lincoln County, North Carolina